She's Got the Look is a reality series created for and aired on TV Land. Hosted by model Kim Alexis, twenty women compete to become the next great supermodel 35 years or older. Celebrity judges, Robert Verdi, Sean Patterson and Roshumba Williams, whittle down the cast of twenty until they find the one who has 'the look'. Beverly Johnson was a judge for the first two seasons.

TV Land's nationwide search, which included months of online submissions, auditions and regional competitions in Los Angeles, Atlanta and New York City resulted in flying twenty contenders to New York. These semi-finalists were put to the test of expressing themselves and their fashion know-how. Ten finalists were then selected to live in a loft and compete in challenges such as photo shoots, runway competitions and tests on their fashion sense. At the conclusion of the competition, one woman is crowned the ultimate winner.

The series premiered on June 4, 2008 with six back-to-back episodes. A second season aired in 2009. Season three premiered on August 25, 2010. There are currently no plans to continue the show.

Host and judges
 Brooke Burke, Model/TV Show Host. Burke brought her modeling experience to the show as the host of season three, replacing supermodel Kim Alexis.
Roshumba Williams, Model/TV Reporter. Williams replaced Beverly Johnson as a judge in season three.
Robert Verdi, Celebrity Stylist. Celebrated for his keen eye and witty commentary as the red carpet correspondent and fashion columnist, Verdi is also one of Hollywood's most sought-after stylists, whose clients include Eva Longoria and Hugh Jackman.
Sean Patterson, President of Wilhelmina Models. Sean Patterson has helped launch and foster the careers of stars like Fergie, Mark Vanderloo and Gabriel Aubry.

Season 1

The winner receives a lucrative modeling contract with the world famous Wilhelmina Models, Inc and a photo spread for Self.

Judges
Kim Alexis (Host)
Beverly Johnson
Robert Verdi
Sean Patterson

Contestants
(ages stated are at time of contest)

Call-out order

 The contestant won the leg-up challenge.
 The contestant was eliminated.
 The contestant won the reward challenge but was eliminated at the same episode
 The contestant was eliminated outside of judging panel
 The contestant won the competition.

Season 2
On September 16, 2008, TV Land announced casting for Season 2 of the series.  Open casting calls were held in Los Angeles on September 29, 2008, in Dallas on October 2, 2008, in Chicago on October 6, 2008 and in New York City on October 8, 2008.  On June 11, 2009, TV Land aired the first episode of Season 2.  Eleven semi-finalists were chosen instead of the traditional ten.

The winner receives a lucrative modeling contract with the world famous Wilhelmina Models, a photo spread for Self magazine and a cash prize of $100,000.

Contestants
(ages stated are at time of contest)

Call-out order

 The contestant won the leg-up challenge.
 The contestant was eliminated.
 The contestant voluntarily withdrew from the competition.
 The contestant won the competition.

 In Episode 1, ten semi-finalists were originally chosen to enter the competition, but Shelly was added as an eleventh semi-finalist.
 In Episode 4, the women performed as duos.  Cindy and Theresa were jointly called first, then Rachel and Sandy were called forward as the bottom two, simultaneously revealing Dolores, Jamie, LeeAnne, and Shelly to be safe.
 In Episode 5, LeeAnne, Rachel, and Shelly were called forward as the bottom three, simultaneously revealing Cindy, Dolores, Jamie, and Theresa to be safe.
 In Episode 6, Dolores was called after Shelly but was eliminated, leaving Cindy, Jamie, LeeAnne, and Theresa as-then uncalled.  Jamie was ultimately eliminated among those four.

Season 3
On August 25, 2010, TV Land aired the first episode of the new season of the series. Brooke Burke replaced Kim Alexis as the host for the third season and Beverly Johnson was replaced by Roshumba Williams. The cast was kept to the traditional ten contestants.

The winner receives a lucrative modeling contract with the world famous Wilhelmina Models, Inc and a photo spread for Self.

Contestants
(ages stated are at time of contest)

Call-out order

 The contestant was eliminated.
 The contestant won the leg-up challenge.
 The contestant won the leg-up challenge, but was eliminated.
 The contestant won two leg-up challenges.
 The contestant won the competition.

 In Episode 1 the casting call-out order was not shown. The table reflects the call-out order from the first elimination.
 In Episode 2, the women were given makeovers, but Jocelyn was reluctant to have her hair cut to a shorter length. Marilin won the leg-up challenge and was granted immunity from elimination. She chose to save her immunity for use later in the competition.
 In Episode 3 the women did a wire-suspension fashion show for their elimination challenge. Julie was afraid to do the challenge due to her fear of heights, but still chose to perform the task. Marilin used her immunity from elimination, granted to her in the previous episode.
 In Episode 4 after Marilin and Jocelyn were said to be safe, Diane, Julie, and Susan were called out. Susan was eliminated and Julie was said to be safe. Diane was eliminated, simultaneously revealing Nina and Rachelle to be safe.
 In Episode 6 Jocelyn, Julie, and Marilin were called out after Rachelle was safe, and Jocelyn was eliminated, simultaneously revealing Marilin and Julie to be safe.

International version
 Currently airing franchise    Franchise with an upcoming season  Franchise no longer airing

References

External links
 Watch Full episodes of She's Got the Look at TVLand.com
 

 Cindy Cohen's website
LeeAnne Locken's website

2008 American television series debuts
2000s American reality television series
2010s American reality television series
2010 American television series endings
English-language television shows
Modeling-themed reality television series
Television series by Fremantle (company)
TV Land original programming